Dioptis areolata is a moth of the family Notodontidae first described by Francis Walker in 1854. It is found in Brazil and Venezuela.

References

Moths described in 1854
Notodontidae of South America